The Achréidh na Gaillimhe (English: Galway City Gaeltacht) comprises five electoral divisions: Bearna, Baile an Bhriotaigh, An Caisleán Gearr, Mionlach and Cnoc na Cathrach. Due to its proximity to Ireland's biggest Gaeltacht, Galway city has always been important for the language movement and many Irish speakers settling or moving to Galway. According to the 2016 census, 31,583 people (41%) in Galway City said they could speak Irish, but only 2,344 people (3%) spoke it daily.

Surrounding areas
There are approximately 9,000 people living in small villages across the city's hinterland with an estimated 1,500 daily Irish speakers. These villages are Lisín an Bhealaigh, Leacach Beag, Baile Chláir, Ceathrú an Bhrúnaigh, An Carn Mór and Baile an Teampaill.

References

 

Gaeltacht places
Geography of Galway (city)